Virgin Stripped Bare by Her Bachelors (Oh! Soo-jung) is a 2000 South Korean erotic comedy-drama, directed by Hong Sang-soo. It was screened in the Un Certain Regard section at the 2000 Cannes Film Festival.

It follows the romantic travails of a video producer and a gallery owner, and the web of deceit they spin around their relationship. It was an early success in the short career of female star Lee Eun-ju, who took her own life five years later.

The English title of the film is presumably a reference to Marcel Duchamp's artwork The Bride Stripped Bare By Her Bachelors, Even.

Plot 
Soo-jung (Lee Eun-ju) is a scriptwriter for a local cable TV station. She is close with the program producer Young-soo (Moon Sung-keun). In attempts to urge his rich friend Jae-hoon to finance an independent film he is currently directing, Young-soo visits Jae-hoon's (Jeong Bo-seok) gallery with Soo-jung tagging along. Jae-hoon finds himself attracted to Soo-jung and asks her to become his lover. Soo-jung somewhat reluctantly accepts the offer on condition that it will only be when they go out for a drink. Their tug-of-war reveals that Soo-jung is still a virgin and this impresses Jae-hoon as well as escalates his frustration. Meanwhile, Young-soo also expresses his feelings for Soo-jung. Soo-jung will have to decide whether to surrender her virginity as Jae-hoon anxiously awaits her at a hotel room.

Cast
 Lee Eun-ju as Soo-jung
 Moon Sung-keun as Young-soo
 Jeong Bo-seok as Jae-hoon

Awards 
2001 Grand Bell Awards
 Best New Actress - Lee Eun-ju

2000 Asia-Pacific Film Festival
Best Screenplay

2000 Tokyo International Film Festival
 Special Mention

References

External links 
 

2000 films
2000 romantic drama films
South Korean black-and-white films
South Korean nonlinear narrative films
Films directed by Hong Sang-soo
South Korean independent films
2000s Korean-language films
South Korean erotic drama films
South Korean romantic drama films
2000 independent films
2000s South Korean films